Ola Bjørnssønn Johannessen (born 17 May 1939) is a Norwegian actor, stage producer and theatre director.

He was born in Trondheim to Bjørn Elness Johannessen and Aasta Barbara Sivertsen, and married actress Marit Olaug Østbye in 1974. He made his stage debut at Det Norske Teatret in 1961, and worked at this theatre from 1962 to 1970. He served as theatre director at Trøndelag Teater from 1979 to 1984, at Rogaland Teater from 1994 to 1997, and again at Trøndelag Teater from 1997 to 2000.

References

External links
 

1939 births
Living people
Norwegian theatre directors
Norwegian male stage actors
Norwegian male film actors
Norwegian male television actors
20th-century Norwegian male actors
21st-century Norwegian male actors
Actors from Trondheim
Norwegian theatre managers and producers